Zhu Shijie (1249–1314), courtesy name Hanqing, pseudonym Songting, was a Chinese mathematician and writer. He was a Chinese mathematician during the Yuan Dynasty. Zhu was born close to today's Beijing. Two of his mathematical works have survived. Introduction to Computational Studies ( Suan hsüeh Ch'i-mong), and Jade Mirror of the Four Unknowns.

Suanxue qimeng

The Suan hsüeh Ch'i-mong, written in 1299, is an elementary textbook on mathematics in three volumes, 20 chapters and 259 problems.  This book also showed how to measure different two-dimensional shapes and three-dimensional solids. The Introduction had an important influence on the development of mathematics in Japan. The book was once lost in China until Qing dynasty mathematician  Luo Shilin bought a Korean printed edition, and re-published in Yangzhou. Since then this book was reprinted several times.

Jade Mirror of the Four Unknowns

Zhu's second book, Jade Mirror of the Four Unknowns, written in 1303, is his most important work. With this book, Zhu advanced Chinese algebra. The first four of the 288 problems for solution illustrate his method of the four unknowns. He shows how to convert a problem stated verbally into a system of polynomial equations (up to 14th order), by using up to four unknowns: 天 Heaven, 地 Earth, 人 Man, 物 Matter, and then how to reduce the system to a single polynomial equation in one unknown by successive elimination of unknowns. He then solved the high order equation  by Southern Song dynasty mathematician Qin Jiushao's "Ling long kai fang" method published in  Shùshū Jiǔzhāng (“Mathematical Treatise in Nine Sections”) in 1247 (more than 570 years before English mathematician William Horner's method using synthetic division). To do this, he makes use of what is currently known as the Pascal triangle, which he labels as the diagram of an ancient method first discovered by Jia Xian before 1050. The final equation and one of its solutions is given for each of the 288 problems.

Zhu also found square and cube roots by solving quadratic and cubic equations, and added to the understanding of series and progressions, classifying them according to the coefficients of the Pascal triangle. He also showed how to solve systems of linear equations by reducing the matrix of their coefficients to diagonal form. He applied these methods also to algebraic equations, inventing "the equivalent of the resultant". His methods pre-date Blaise Pascal, William Horner, and modern matrix methods by many centuries. The preface of the book describes how Zhu traveled around China for 20 years as a teacher of mathematics.

The methods of Jade Mirror of the Four Unknowns  form the foundation for Wu's method of characteristic set.

References

Du, Shiran, "Zhu Shijie". Encyclopedia of China (Mathematics Edition), 1st ed.
GRATTAN-GUINNESS, I.: The Norton History of the Mathematical Sciences, 1998.
Guo Shuchun (tr. modern Chinese), Chen Zaixin (English tr.), Guo Jinhai (annotation), Zhu Shijie: Jade mirror of the Four Unknowns, Chinese and English bilingual, vol I & 2,Liaoning education Press, China, 2006.  
HO Peng-Yoke: Article on Chu Shih-chieh in the Dictionary of Scientific Biography, New York, 1970.hi
Hoe, J.: The jade mirror of the four unknowns, Mingming Bookroom, New Zealand, 2007. 
Hoe, J.: Les systèmes d'équations polynômes dans le Siyuan Yujian (1303), Paris, Collège de France (Mémoires de l'Institut des Hautes Etudes Chinoises, Vol VI),1977.
KONANTZ, E.L.:The Precious Mirror of the Four Elements, China journal of Science and Arts, Vol 2, No 4, 1924.
LAM Lay-yong: Chu shih-chieh's Suan hsüeh ch'i-meng, Archive for the history of sciences, Vol 21, Berlin, 1970.
MARTZLOFF, J-C.: A history of Chinese Mathematics, Springer-Verlag, Berlin, 1997.
MIKAMI Yoshio, Development of Mathematics in China and Japan, Chapter 14 Chu Shih-chieh p89-98. 1913 Leipzig. Library of Congress catalog card number 61-13497.
Mumford, David, "What’s so Baffling About Negative Numbers? — a Cross-Cultural Comparison", in C. S. Seshadri (Ed.), Studies in the History of Indian Mathematics, 2010.

External links
 

1249 births
1314 deaths
13th-century Chinese mathematicians
14th-century Chinese mathematicians
Educators from Hebei
Medieval Chinese mathematicians
Yuan dynasty science writers
Writers from Hebei